Starfleet I: The War Begins is a 1984 strategy computer game designed by Trevor Sorensen and developed by Interstel (some versions by Cygnus Multimedia). It was released for Apple II, DOS and Commodore 64. Versions for the Commodore 128 (bundled together as Commodore 64/128, though it included a discrete version for the 128 with 80-column support), Atari ST and Atari 8-bit family were released in 1986 and versions for the Amiga and Macintosh were released in 1987. The game was successful enough to spawn sequels which are collectively known as the Star Fleet series.

Description
The game resembles the Star Trek text game. The player is a new graduate of Starfleet Academy in command of a starship. The United Galactic Alliance (UGA) is at war with the Krellans and Zaldrons, so the player has plenty of combatants to engage from the beginning.

Eschewing digital graphics, Star Fleet I presents all its information in color ASCII characters. Gameplay centers on two main activities: navigation and combat. Navigation takes place on the Main Computer GUI. It consists of a main star chart map, the player's current position, and visual displays. Other information may be accessed using appropriate commands. Navigation may be conducted manually or automatically.

Each area, or quadrant, on the map is displayed as a series of numbers representing asteroids, starbases, and enemy ships present. The ship's long-range sensors can detect entities in adjacent quadrants, while short-range sensors detect items in the current quadrant. The ship also has a limited number of probes for very long-range exploration.

Combat is the primary activity of Star Fleet I. Combat is initiated whenever the player's starship enters a hostile area. Each quadrant may contain a number of starbases, space marines, and Krellan (maximum of five) or Zaldron (often just one) enemy ships. The player may find hostile quadrants by chance or may be summoned by a starbase under attack.

Enemies automatically engage the player's ship with phasers. While the player's ship outmatches Krellan starships, several can prove dangerous. Zaldron ships may also be present, but cloaked. The Zaldron ships must de-cloak before engaging the player, also using phasers as a primary weapon.

The player may either destroy or disable enemy starships. Disabled starships can then be captured and delivered to friendly starbases.

The player has a lethal arsenal at their disposal with which to engage the enemy: phasers, torpedoes, and mines. Torpedoes destroy enemy ships (provided they strike the target), while the other weapons may disable (or ultimately destroy) enemy ships. When disabled, a ship may only be captured by ordering space marines to board the vessel. Automatic combat between the enemy's crew and the marines will then ensue. If victorious, the player receives some power and a number of prisoners. The captured ship may then be towed to a starbase.

During capture attempts, however, enemy spies or prisoners may escape on the player's ship undetected and disable vital systems. Such situations result in an "Intruder Alert", forcing the player to search for the culprit.

As a last resort, the player may to choose to self-destruct his ship, adversely affecting the final score.

After completing a mission, the player is rated on several factors, including number of enemies eliminated or captured and starbases rescued.  Successful missions may result in promotions or commendations.

Reception

Jerry Pournelle wrote in BYTE that Star Fleet I "is likely to drive me crazy but I keep coming back for more", describing it as "frankly better than the Star Trek game I wrote". Mark Bausman reviewed the game for Computer Gaming World, and stated that "Star Fleet One is a truly remarkable update of the classic Star Trek game". inCider gave the Apple II version four stars out of four, describing it as "ideal for anyone who enjoys an addicting space game". Info gave the Amiga version two-plus stars out of five, stating that "If you've played public domain versions of Star Trek you've played Star Fleet I". The magazine criticized the graphics: "It looks like it was ported lock, stock, and lack of imagination directly from the IBM-PC version". Game reviewers Hartley and Pattie Lesser complimented the game in their "The Role of Computers" column in Dragon #118 (1987), noting that they were "very impressed with this offering," and stated that "There is a sense of realism to the game that is unmatched by other offerings."

In a 1992 survey of science fiction games, Computer Gaming World gave the title five stars of five, calling it a "superb rendition of the 'main-frame' Star Trek ... this reviewer still plays it today, even though the graphics are primitive". A 1994 survey in the magazine of strategic space games set in the year 2000 and later gave the game three-plus stars out of five, stating "A real shame that this product hasn't been updated like Empire Deluxe".

In 1996, Computer Gaming World declared Starfleet I the 150th-best computer game ever released.

References

External links

Star Fleet I: The War Begins at Lemon64
ASCII-World review of Star Fleet I
History of the Star Fleet games

1984 video games
Amiga games
Apple II games
Atari 8-bit family games
Atari ST games
Commodore 64 games
Commodore 128 games
DOS games
Classic Mac OS games
Science fiction video games
Space simulators
Turn-based strategy video games
Video games developed in the United States